Military history of Sparta may refer to:
History of Sparta, for historical information
Spartan army, for the wars and soldiers of Sparta

See also
Sparta, for a look at Sparta in a more geographical sense